The 2008 CONCACAF Men's Olympic Qualifying was an international football tournament that was held in the United States from 11 and 23 March 2008. The eight national teams involved in the tournament were required to register a squad of twenty players, two of whom had to be goalkeepers.

The final lists were published by CONCACAF on 10 and 11 March 2008.

The age listed for each player is on 11 March 2008, the first day of the tournament. A flag is included for coaches who are of a different nationality than their own national team. Players marked in bold have been capped at full international level.

Group A

Cuba

Honduras

Panama
The roster for the Panamanian team was as follows.

[*]Carlos Rodriguez was called up after Jose Venegas got injured 4 days before the start of the tournament.

United States

Group B

Canada
The roster for the Canadian team was as follows.

Guatemala

Haiti

Mexico
Coach: Hugo Sánchez

The roster for the Mexican team was as follows.

References

External links
 2008 CONCACAF Men’s Olympic Qualification Group B Rosters

Concacaf Men Pre-olympic Tournament Squads, 2008